The Royal 22 Régiment Band is the regimental band of the Royal 22nd Regiment. It is based at CFB Valcartier (Valcartier Garrison) in Quebec and is assigned to the 2nd Canadian Division Support Group. It is the only French-speaking regular military band in Canada.

History 
The regimental band was formed in Quebec City in 1922 with the 20 members of the former Royal Canadian Artillery Band. A year later, the band began performing at the Orpheum Theatre, in Quebec City and on radio station CKAC in Montreal. During World War II the ensemble gave performances primarily to encourage recruitment. The band has  performed for the coronations of two Canadian monarchs (George VI in 1937 and Elizabeth II in 1953). It was present at the 300th, 350th, and 400th anniversary of Quebec City. The band resided at the Quebec’s Citadel until 1988, after which time it moved to the Canadian Forces Base at Valcartier near Quebec City. Following a reorganization of Canadian military bands in July 1994, the regimental band was dissolved. 3 years later, it was reestablished. The band joined the ranks of the 2nd Canadian Division Support Group in 2006.

Notable activities
The band has participated in the guard mounting ceremony at the Citadelle of Québec continuously since 1945.
In 1967, the band was one of 17 bands that took part in the Canadian Armed Forces Tattoo.
For a number of years, the band, along with the Musique des Voltigeurs de Québec, hosted the Quebec City International Festival of Military Bands.
In 2007, the band marched in O'Higgins Park in Santiago de Chile during the Great Military Parade of Chile.
In 2008, the band took part in a parade as well as other events related to the 400th anniversary of Quebec City.
The International Anthem of the Royal Golf Clubs, which commissioned by Lieutenant Governor of Quebec, was premiered by the band on 12 September 2017.
In February 2019, the band's brass quintet performed in Kuujjuaq in the first visit of a military band in northern Quebec.
In December 2019, the band has been part of the Canadian delegation deployed in Italy to commemorate the 75th anniversary of the Italian campaign (World War II).

Conductors 

 Captain Charles O'Neill (1922–1937)
 Captain E. Bélanger (1937–1961)
 Captain Joseph Pierre Armand Ferland (1961–1965)
 Major Jean-François Pierret (1965–1978)
 Major Charles Villeneuve (1978–1980)
 Captain Jean-Pierre Montminy (1980–1982)
 Captain A. Dion (1982–1986)
 Captain D. Bouchard (1986–1990) 
 Major Denis Bernier (1990–1994 and 1997–2002)
 Major J. Destrempes (2002–2008)
 Major Patrick Picard (2008–2012)
 Major Eric Gagnon (2012–2016)
 Captain Christian Richer (2016–2018)
 Captain Vincent Roy (2018–Present)

See also
 Governor General's Foot Guards Band
 Canadian Grenadier Guards Band
 Royal Military College of Canada Bands

References

External links
 
 Biography of Charles O'Neill
 The band at the Quebec Tattoo
 The band playing the Hymn to the Fallen in October 2015
Le Royal 22 Régiment Canada avec la Fanfara Bersaglieri Italia

Royal 22nd Regiment
Bands of the Canadian Army
Musical groups established in 1922
1922 establishments in Quebec